Gabriel Davis dos Santos (born October 23, 1989), commonly known as Gabriel Davis, is a Brazilian professional footballer who plays as an attacking midfielder for Paysandu Sport Club.

Career
Gabriel Davis started his career with Juventude, he remained with the aforementioned club for three years while making 123 appearances and scoring 43 goals. He departed Juventude in 2009 to join Porto Alegre, he played for Porto Alegre for two seasons between 2009 and 2011 and made a total of 73 league appearances and scored 15 times. 2011 saw Gabriel Davis make a short-term move to Luverdense, before joining Uberaba and then subsequently Boa.

In late 2012 Gabriel Davis completed a transfer to Santa Cruz but left a year later as he left Brazil for the first-time to join Thai club BEC Tero Sasana, however he returned to Brazil not long after as he played just 58 minutes for BEC Tero Sasana against Ratchaburi. On his return to his homeland, he agreed to join Uberlândia but departed soon after to join Grêmio Barueri in 2014.

In 2015 Gabriel Davis signed for Villa Nova, he played 9 times and scored 2 before going on to join Tupi. For Tupi, he participated in 12 matches and scored once. In January 2016, Gabriel Davis completed a move to URT. He made his URT debut on 31 January against Cruzeiro in the 2016 Campeonato Mineiro.

...

On 03 December 2020, Gabriel Davis joined S.E.R. Caxias on half of season in 2020-2021 Campeonato Brasileiro Série D. On 05 December 2020, he made his official S.E.R. Caxias appearance on bench and debut in 71 minute in the first leg of round 32 vs Mirassol FC.

On 11 January 2021, Gabriel Davis return Manaus Futebol Clube. In the Quarter-Finals of 2020 Copa Verde, on 08 February, he scored 1 goal (59' minute second leg) in the winning match vs Paysandu Sport Club, his club reach to Semi-Finals vs Clube do Remo. On 31 March, he scored a winning goal in 2-1 home victory vs Sao Raimundo Esporte Clube (AM) in round 4 of Campeonato Amazonense de Futebol de 2021. On 26 Jun, he scored the first goal in winning game against Tombense Futebol Clube in group A - Serie C.

On 02 December 2021, Gabriel Davis joined Amazonas Futebol Clube. He played 13 games and had 5 goals, 1 assist.

On 11 May 2022, Gabriel Davis joined Paysandu Sport Club. On 19 November 2022, his team won 2022 Copa Verde.

Achievements

Club
Boa Esporte Clube
Taca Minas Gerais: : Winners : 2012

Quang Nam FC
Vietnamese Cup: : Runner-up : 2019

Manaus Futebol Clube
Campeonato Amazonense: : Winners : 2021

Paysandu Sport Club
Copa Verde: : Winners : 2022

International

References

External links

1989 births
Living people
Brazilian footballers
Brazilian expatriate footballers
Expatriate footballers in Thailand
Brazilian expatriate sportspeople in Thailand
Esporte Clube Juventude players
Luverdense Esporte Clube players
Uberaba Sport Club players
Boa Esporte Clube players
Villa Nova Atlético Clube players
Tupi Football Club players
Sertãozinho Futebol Clube players
Gabriel Davis
Terengganu FC players
Association football midfielders